Mats Göran Hallin (born March 9, 1958) is a Swedish former professional ice hockey player who played 152 games in the National Hockey League with the New York Islanders and Minnesota North Stars between 1982 and 1986. He would win the Stanley Cup with the Islanders in 1983. He is currently the Director of European Scouting for the Chicago Blackhawks, a position he has held since 2014.

Career statistics

Regular season and playoffs

International

References

External links
 

1958 births
Living people
Chicago Blackhawks scouts
Indianapolis Checkers players
Malmö Redhawks players
Minnesota North Stars players
New York Islanders players
People from Eskilstuna
Södertälje SK players
Sportspeople from Södermanland County
Springfield Indians players
Stanley Cup champions
Swedish expatriate ice hockey players in the United States
Swedish ice hockey coaches
Swedish ice hockey left wingers
Washington Capitals draft picks